Applebaum  is a Jewish surname. It may refer to:

 Anne Applebaum (born 1964), journalist and author
 Chris Applebaum, American music video director
 Dallin Applebaum, American songwriter, pianist, vocalist and music producer
 David Applebaum (1952–2003), Israeli doctor and terrorist victim
 Nava Applebaum (c. 1983–2003), David's daughter and terrorist victim
 Edward Applebaum (1937–2020), American composer
 Elisha Applebaum (born 1995), English actress
 Jon Applebaum (born 1985), American politician
 Leah Applebaum, American voice actress
 Louis Applebaum (1918–2000), Canadian composer and conductor
 Mark Applebaum, American composer and music professor
 Michael Applebaum (born 1963), Canadian politician and former Mayor of Montreal
 Sid Applebaum (1924–2016), American grocery magnate
 Stan Applebaum (1922–2019), American musician, orchestrator and arranger

Fictional characters
 "Bonita Applebum", American popular song

See also 
 Appelbaum
 Apfelbaum

References 

Jewish surnames
Germanic-language surnames
Yiddish-language surnames